The Quinta de Los Molinos  is more than two centuries old and a national monument, an oasis in the heart of the city located at the intersection of one of Havana’s heaviest traffic arteries: Infanta, Carlos III, and Boyeros avenues. The Quinta since colonial times has had a complicated history to various events and characters, mainly with General Máximo Gómez.

The original area exceeded the territory it currently occupies as it extended north to approximately the location of the University of Havana, to the northwest to Hospital Calixto García, and west to G Street, including the Castillo del Principe, and south to Salvador Allende avenue and east to Infanta street.

It is in the general vicinity of the Paseo de Tacón (Avenida Carlos III), the University of Havana, and the Castillo del Principe.

History 

The Quinta de Los Molinos  was the location where the Captaincy General of Cuba maintained their summer residence  in the 1850s - 1870s.

The location acquires the name Quinta de Los Molinos , due to the existence of two mills used to grind tobacco and obtain snuff. The mills were owned by Martín de Aróstegui, president of the Royal Tobacco Factory belonging to the Spanish king, hence its name. This name appeared in the National Archive of Cuba in 1850 and has been maintained to this day. Before 1850 it was known as the Tacón Garden, as it appears in a plan of 1843 and in a marble plaque, enclosed in the wall of an old building in the area.

These mills operated until the second half of the 19th century, moved by the force of the water from the so-called
Zanja Real, the first aqueduct that Havana had. Its construction began in 1592, and they were finished after 27 years of work. Very close to the Cathedral of Havana is the Callejón del Chorro, whose name comes from its old use. Originally the Cathedral was called Plaza de la Ciénaga, since it was there where the people of Havana came to stock up on water, brought by the Zanja Real.

Residence of General Máximo Gómez
At the end of the War of Independence in Cuba, with the defeat of Spain and in the absence of the representation of the Cuban people, the Treaty of Paris was signed on December 10. After the war was formally ended, the President of the Republic of Cuba in Arms, Bartolomé Masó, met the Assembly of Representatives of Santa Cruz del Sur and resigned from his position. The Assembly moved to Havana, to house number 819 on Calzada del Cerro.

Aqueduct
The more than 11 km long El Chorro, as the Zanja Real was known, started at the Almendares River and brought water to Old Havana crossing Zanja Street (bearing its name). This first aqueduct ceased its use with the development of the city. Thus the Spanish government was forced to find an alternate solution for the supply of water to Old Havana, creating in 1835, the aqueduct of Fernando VII and the Albear in 1858 which were joined in 1878.

Botanical garden
When the king's mills disappeared, the Botanical Garden of Havana was founded, along with the construction of the resthouse of the Captaincy General of Cuba. Starting in the 1820s, research and studies on plants were carried out by Felipe Poey Aloy. The Botanical Garden was transferred, from the area that currently includes the American Fraternity Park and the south of the National Capitol, where the first Botanical Garden had been founded in 1817.

The herbarium of the old Botanical Garden of Havana, in which it was started, sought the development of the botanical collection. Álvaro Reinoso carried out many of his experiments, having many small plots dedicated to the cultivation of sugar cane. The University of Havana took over between 1850 and 1871, during this time it passed into the hands of the Spanish government for a period of 8 years.

After this period, the Spanish government returned the land to the University establishing the School of Botany, which sharing its function with the School of Second Education.

In 1906 the garden was inscribed in the World System of Botanical Gardens. The butterfly Hedychium coronarium was declared in 1936 as the national flower of Cuba.

The villa’s botanical garden was surrounded by wrought-iron railings. In addition to its plants, attributing it in 1906 a place in the International Association of Botanic Gardens, there are life-size statues and busts of Olympian gods such as Minerva, Juno, and Ceres.

People
In 1888 the Cuban Grand Master and World Chess Champion José Raúl Capablanca was born in the Castillo del Príncipe whose father was a Spanish army officer who lived there.

Gallery

See also

 Paseo de Tacón
 Campo de Marte, Havana
 Plaza del Vapor, Havana
 Palacio de Aldama
 La Alameda de Paula, Havana

Notes

References

External links
 De Carlos III a Reina

 Historias escondidas de mi Habana*Quinta de los Molinos

 Rutas y Andares por la Quinta de los Molinos

Buildings and structures in Havana
Neoclassical architecture in Cuba
History of Havana